Ahmad Mukhtar Baban (1900 – 24 October 1976) was Prime Minister of Iraq under the Kingdom of Iraq in 1958, and the first Kurd to hold the position.

Biography
Baban became prime minister on 19 May 1958, during a time of political tension. The monarchies of Iraq and Jordan had recently agreed upon a confederation known as the Arab Federation. The federation, and Baban's time as prime minister, lasted for only two months.

On 14 July 1958, the monarchy was overthrown in a coup, and a republic was established under Abdul Karim Qassim. Baban was arrested and sentenced to death by the People's Court, which was established under Qassim's leadership following the coup. Unlike the royal family and many Iraqi politicians in the monarchy, the sentence was reduced to life in prison.

References

Prime Ministers of Iraq
1900 births
1976 deaths
Iraqi prisoners sentenced to death
Prisoners sentenced to death by Iraq